Anne Sofie von Otter (born 9 May 1955) is a Swedish mezzo-soprano. Her repertoire encompasses lieder, operas, oratorios and also rock and pop songs.

Early life
Von Otter was born in Stockholm, Sweden. Her father was Göran von Otter, a Swedish diplomat in Berlin during World War II. She grew up in Bonn, London and Stockholm. She studied in Stockholm and at the Guildhall School of Music and Drama in London, where her teachers included Vera Rózsa. In 1982, she won second prize in the ARD International Music Competition.

From 1983 to 1985, she was an ensemble member of the Basel Opera, where she made her professional operatic début as Alcina in Haydn's Orlando paladino. She made her Royal Opera House, Covent Garden, début in 1985 and her La Scala debut in 1987. Her Metropolitan Opera début was in December 1988 as Cherubino in The Marriage of Figaro.

Career 
Her recording of Grieg songs won the 1993 Gramophone Record of the Year, the first time in the award's history that it had gone to a song recording. In 2001, she released her album with Elvis Costello, For the Stars, for which she won an Edison Award. She was awarded the Grammy Award for Best Classical Vocal Solo in 2015 for her album of French songs, Douce France. She is a regular recital and recording partner with Swedish pianist Bengt Forsberg.

In 2006, von Otter sang the Evangelist in the premiere of Sven-David Sandström's Ordet – en passion. Other work in contemporary music has included singing the role of The Woman in Senza Sangue of Péter Eötvös. In other media, she appeared in the film A Late Quartet.

In 2007, she released an album of music written by composers imprisoned in the Nazi ghetto of Theresienstadt concentration camp (also known as Terezin) prior to their transportation to the death camp of Auschwitz. She collaborated on this project with Christian Gerhaher (baritone) and chamber musicians. She has stated that the material has special personal meaning for her as her father had attempted unsuccessfully during the war to spread information that he had received from SS officer Kurt Gerstein about the Nazi death camps.

In 2016, von Otter sang Leonora in the world premiere of Thomas Adès' The Exterminating Angel, and again in 2017 at the Royal Opera House, Covent Garden. She created the principal role of Charlotte in Sebastian Fagerlund's 2017 opera Autumn Sonata, based on the 1979 film by Ingmar Bergman at the Finnish National Opera in Helsinki conducted by John Storgårds.

Family life 
Von Otter was married to Benny Fredriksson until his suicide on 17 March 2018. He was an actor and managing director of The Stockholm House of Culture, including the Stadsteater (Stockholm City Theatre). The couple had two children. She lives in the capital Stockholm.

Awards and honours
1995: appointed Hovsångerska by King Carl XVI Gustaf of Sweden
2003: Rolf Schock Prize in the musical arts category
2013: Honorary Degree, University Pierre and Marie Curie, Paris

Discography

Selective charting albums

(Peak positions in Sverigetopplistan, the Swedish national record chart)

Recordings

Lieder and songs
 Alban Berg: Sieben frühe Lieder & Der Wein conducted by Claudio Abbado (1995) Deutsche Grammophon
 Hector Berlioz: Mélodies with Cord Garben (piano) (1994) and Les nuits d'été conducted by James Levine (1995) Deutsche Grammophon
 Les nuits d'été conducted by Marc Minkowski (2011) Naïve
 Johannes Brahms: Lieder with Bengt Forsberg (piano) (1990) Deutsche Grammophon
 Cécile Chaminade: Mots d'amour with Bengt Forsberg (piano) (2001) Deutsche Grammophon
 Edvard Grieg: Songs/Lieder with Bengt Forsberg (piano) (1993) Deutsche Grammophon
 Erich Wolfgang Korngold: Rendezvous with Korngold with Bengt Forsberg (piano) & Friends (1999) Deutsche Grammophon
 Ingvar Lidholm: Songs and Chamber Music conducted by Björn Sjögren (1996) Caprice Records
 Gustav Mahler: Des Knaben Wunderhorn with Thomas Quasthoff conducted by Claudio Abbado (1999) Deutsche Grammophon
 Kindertotenlieder conducted by Pierre Boulez (2004) Deutsche Grammophon
 Maurice Ravel: Shéhérazade conducted by Pierre Boulez (2002) Deutsche Grammophon
 Arnold Schoenberg: Gurre-Lieder conducted by Simon Rattle (2002) EMI
 Franz Schubert: Lieder, with Bengt Forsberg (piano) (1997) and Lieder with Orchestra conducted by Claudio Abbado (2003) Deutsche Grammophon
 Robert Schumann: Frauen-Liebe und Leben with Bengt Forsberg (piano) (1995) Deutsche Grammophon
 Jean Sibelius: Anne Sofie von Otter sings Sibelius with Bengt Forsberg (piano) BIS
 Kurt Weill: Speak Low: Songs by Kurt Weill conducted by John Eliot Gardiner (1994) Deutsche Grammophon
 Hugo Wolf: Spanisches Liederbuch with Olaf Bär (baritone) and Geoffrey Parsons (piano) (1995) EMI
 Various: Boldemann Gefors Hillborg conducted by Kent Nagano (2008) Deutsche Grammophon
 La Bonne chanson – French Chamber Songs with Bengt Forsberg (piano) and others (1996) Deutsche Grammophon
 Brahms / Schumann with Barbara Bonney (soprano), Kurt Streit (tenor), Olaf Bär (baritone), Helmut Deutsch and Bengt Forsberg (piano duet) (1994) EMI
 Douce France – classical French songs (disc 1) and chansons (disc 2) with Bengt Forsberg (piano) and others (2013) Naive
 Folksongs with Bengt Forsberg (piano) (2000) Deutsche Grammophon
 Lieder / Mélodies by Beethoven Meyerbeer Spohr with Melvyn Tan (fortepiano) (2001) Archiv
 Lieder by Wolf and Mahler with Ralf Gothóni (piano) (1989) Deutsche Grammophon
 Love's Twilight – Late Romantic Songs by Berg Korngold Strauss with Bengt Forsberg (piano) (1994) Deutsche Grammophon
 Mahler Zemlinsky Lieder conducted by John Eliot Gardiner (1996) Deutsche Grammophon
 Mozart – Haydn: Songs & Canzonettas with Melvyn Tan (fortepiano) (1995) Archiv
 Music for a While – Baroque Melodies (2004) Deutsche Grammophon
 Terezín / Theresienstadt with Bengt Forsberg (piano), Christian Gerhaher, Gerold Huber (piano) and others (2007) Deutsche Grammophon
 Watercolours – Swedish Songs with Bengt Forsberg (piano) (2003) Deutsche Grammophon
 Wings in the Night – Swedish Songs with Bengt Forsberg (piano) (1996) Deutsche Grammophon

Complete operas
 Bartók: Bluebeard's Castle conducted by Bernard Haitink (1996) EMI
 Berlioz: La Damnation de Faust conducted by Myung-whun Chung (1998) Deutsche Grammophon
 Bizet: Carmen conducted by Philippe Jordan (2003) BBC/Arte
 Sebastian Fagerlund: Autumn Sonata (opera) conducted by John Storgårds (2018) BIS
 Gluck: Alceste conducted by Sir John Eliot Gardiner (1990) Philips
 Iphigénie en Aulide conducted by Sir John Eliot Gardiner (1990) Erato
 Orphée et Eurydice conducted by Sir John Eliot Gardiner (1989) EMI
 Handel: Agrippina conducted by Sir John Eliot Gardiner (1997) Philips
 Ariodante conducted by Marc Minkowski (1999) Archiv
 Giulio Cesare conducted by Marc Minkowski (2003) Archiv
 Hercules conducted by Marc Minkowski (2002) Archiv
 Serse by conducted by William Christie (2004) Virgin Classics
 Humperdinck: Hänsel und Gretel conducted by Jeffrey Tate(1989/1990) EMI
 Massenet: Werther conducted by Kent Nagano (1997) Elektra
 Monteverdi: L'incoronazione di Poppea conducted by John Eliot Gardiner (1996) Archiv
 L'Orfeo conducted by John Eliot Gardiner (1987) Archiv
 Mozart: La clemenza di Tito conducted by John Eliot Gardiner (1993) Deutsche Grammophon
 Così fan tutte conducted by Georg Solti (1996) Decca
 Idomeneo conducted by John Eliot Gardiner (1991) Deutsche Grammophon
 Le nozze di Figaro conducted by James Levine (1992) Deutsche Grammophon
 Purcell: Dido and Aeneas conducted by Trevor Pinnock (1989) Archiv
 Rachmaninoff: Aleko conducted by Neeme Järvi (1997) Deutsche Grammophon
 Richard Strauss: Ariadne auf Naxos conducted by Giuseppe Sinopoli (2002) Deutsche Grammophon
 Der Rosenkavalier conducted by Bernard Haitink (1991) EMI
 Der Rosenkavalier conducted by Carlos Kleiber (1995) Deutsche Grammophon DVD only
 Igor Stravinsky: The Rake's Progress conducted by John Eliot Gardiner (1999) Deutsche Grammophon
 Tchaikovsky: Eugene Onegin conducted by James Levine (1988) Deutsche Grammophon

Aria recordings
 Anne Sofie von Otter sings Offenbach, conducted by Marc Minkowski – Deutsche Grammophon
 Baroque Arias by Handel, Monteverdi, Roman and Telemann, with the Drottningholm Baroque Ensemble – Proprius
 Ombre de mon amant, French baroque arias conducted by William Christie – Archiv
 Opera Arias by Gluck, Haydn and Mozart, conducted by Trevor Pinnock – Archiv

Oratorios, symphonies, etc
 Bach: St Matthew Passion English Baroque Soloists, Sir John Eliot Gardiner
 St Matthew Passion Chicago Symphony, Sir Georg Solti; Kiri Te Kanawa, Anthony Rolfe Johnson, Tom Krause, Hans Peter Blochwitz, Glen Ellyn Children's Chorus, Chicago Symphony Chorus
 Beethoven: Symphony No. 9, with Luba Orgonasova, Anthony Rolfe Johnson, Gilles Cachemaille, the Monteverdi Choir and the Orchestre Revolutionaire et Romantique, conducted by Sir John Eliot Gardiner
Berlioz: L'Enfance du Christ, Gilles Cachemaille, Jules Bastin, José Van Dam, Monteverdi Choir, Orchestre de l'Opéra de Lyon, conducted by John Eliot Gardiner - Erato 1988
 Maurice Duruflé: "Requiem", conducted by Michel Plasson – EMI
 Elgar: The Dream of Gerontius, with Alastair Miles and David Rendall, conducted by Sir Colin Davis
 Handel: Jephtha, with Michael Chance, Lynne Dawson and Stephen Varcoe, with the English Baroque Soloists conducted by Sir John Eliot Gardiner
 Messiah, with Arleen Auger, Michael Chance, Howard Crook and John Tomlinson, with Trevor Pinnock and The English Concert
 Messiah, with Sylvia McNair, Michael Chance, Jerry Hadley and Robert Lloyd, with the Academy of St Martin in the Fields conducted by Sir Neville Marriner
 Mauricio Kagel: Sankt-Bach-Passion, conducted by the composer – Naïve
 Mahler: Symphony No. 3, conducted by Pierre Boulez – Deutsche Grammophon
 Mozart: Requiem: Barbara Bonney, Anne Sofie von Otter, English Baroque Soloists, Monteverdi Choir, conducted by John Eliot Gardiner – Archiv
 Great Mass in C minor: Barbara Bonney, Anne Sofie von Otter, English Baroque Soloists, Monteverdi Choir, conducted by Sir John Eliot Gardiner
 Franz Schubert: Rosamunde with the Chamber Orchestra of Europe, conducted by Claudio Abbado
Camille Saint-Saëns, Oratorio de Noël, Royal Opera Theater, Orchestra, The Michael Chamber Choir, conducted by Anders Eby. CD Proprius Musik AB 1994

Other music
 Home for Christmas, classical works and popular tunes for Christmas (1999) Deutsche Grammophon
 For the Stars, a collection of rock and pop songs (by the likes of Brian Wilson, Andersson–Ulvaeus and Lennon–McCartney), with Elvis Costello and Svante Henryson (2001) Deutsche Grammophon
 Peter Sculthorpe: Island Dreaming, with the Brodsky Quartet (2001) Challenge Records
 I Let the Music Speak – Songs of ABBA including "Money, Money, Money" and "The Winner Takes It All" (2006) Deutsche Grammophon
 Noel, classical Christmas music with Bengt Forsberg (2006) Deutsche Grammophon
 Love Songs, with Brad Mehldau (2010) Naïve
 Ottorino Respighi: Il tramonto, with the Brodsky Quartet – Vanguard
 The Metropolitan Opera Gala 1991, Deutsche Grammophon DVD, 00440-073-4582
 James Levine's 25th Anniversary Metropolitan Opera Gala (1996), Deutsche Grammophon DVD, B0004602-09

References

External links

 
 
 
 
 Review by Lisa Hirsch in San Francisco Classical Voice
 Swedish Charts.com search on Anne Sofie von Otter
 Dutch Charts.nl search on Anne Sofie von Otter
 Norwegian Charts.com search on Anne Sofie von Otter

1955 births
Living people
Singers from Stockholm
Swedish expatriates in England
Swedish nobility
Swedish operatic mezzo-sopranos
Alumni of the Guildhall School of Music and Drama
Edison Classical Music Awards winners
Grammy Award winners
Rolf Schock Prize laureates
Deutsche Grammophon artists
Honorary Members of the Royal Academy of Music
Litteris et Artibus recipients
20th-century Swedish women opera singers
21st-century Swedish women opera singers
Prize-winners of the ARD International Music Competition
Swedish people of Walloon descent